The Allgäu Comets are an American football team from Kempten, Germany. The club is named after the Allgäu region of Bavaria, of which Kempten is the largest town.

The club was originally formed as the Kempten Comets and renamed Allgäu Comets in 1993. It has played in Germany's highest football league, the American Football Bundesliga, now the German Football League, from 1985 to 1994. In 2013, it won the southern division of the German Football League 2 and earned the right to compete in the GFL once more in 2014, achieving its greatest success in 2015 when it reached the semi-finals of the play-offs.

History
The club was formed in 1982 as the Kempten Comets.

The club entered competitive football in 1983 in the tier two 2nd American Football Bundesliga. It won its division in its second year there and earned the right to play in the Bundesliga from 1985, a spell that would last for ten seasons, until 1994.

In the Bundesliga the Comets most successful era came from 1986 to 1988, when it finished in the top three of the southern division of the league on each occasion and qualified for the play-offs. The club reached the quarter finals in each of these three years, going out to the Düsseldorf Panther in 1986 and 1988 and the Berlin Adler in 1987. After this the Comets would not reach the play-offs again but remained a competitive side up until the 1994 season. The club's last season in the Bundesliga in 1994, now as the Allgäu Comets, proved disastrous, with the team winning only one out of the first five-season games. The team was withdrawn in mid-season and did not play its final nine games of the 1994 regular season.

The Comets withdrew to the sixth tier Landesliga, a local Bavarian league, for the 1995 season and began their climb back up the league pyramide by winning three consecutive league championships from 1995 to 1997. The club returned to national league level when it re-entered the 2nd Football Bundesliga in 1998 but, after only two seasons, was relegated again in 1999. It returned to the 2nd Bundesliga from 2001 to 2004, achieving good results in its first three seasons there but suffering another relegation in 2004. The Comets once more withdrew to local Bavarian Level for the 2005 season, where they played as a strong side until 2007. The club was promoted to the third tier Regionalliga in 2007 and, after four strong seasons there, to the 2nd Bundesliga, now renamed GFL 2, in 2011.

The Allgäu Comets won the southern division of the GFL 2 in 2012 and earned the right to play-off with the Munich Cowboys for a place in the GFL in 2013, but lost both games. The club once more won its division in 2013 and, once more, qualified for the promotion round. This time, facing the Wiesbaden Phantoms, the Comets were successful and will return to the highest level of football in Germany, the GFL, for 2014, after a twenty-year absence.

The club came fifth in the southern division of the GFL in 2014 and thereby missed out on play-off qualification. The 2015 season was more successful with the team reaching the EFL Bowl where it lost to the Kiel Baltic Hurricanes and finishing second in the southern division of the GFL. It thereby qualified for the play-offs where it defeated the Kiel Baltic Hurricanes in the quarter finals but lost to the eventual champion New Yorker Lions in the semi-finals.

Honours
 EFL Bowl
 Runners-up: 2015
 GFL
 League membership: (16) 1985–1994, 2014–present
 Play-off qualification: (8) 1986–1988, 2015, 2016, 2018, 2021, 2022
 GFL 2
 Southern Division champions: (4) 1983, 1984, 2012, 2013

Recent seasons
Recent seasons of the club:

 PR = Promotion round
 QF = Quarter finals
 SF = Semi finals

References

External links
  Official website
  German Football League official website
  Football History Historic American football tables from Germany

American football teams in Germany
German Football League teams
American football teams established in 1982
American football in Bavaria
1982 establishments in West Germany
Kempten